Drimia maritima (syn. Urginea maritima) is a species of flowering plant in the family Asparagaceae, subfamily Scilloideae (formerly the family Hyacinthaceae). This species is known by several common names, including squill, sea squill, sea onion, and maritime squill. It may also be called red squill, particularly a form which produces red-tinged flowers instead of white. It is native to southern Europe, western Asia, and northern Africa.

Description 

Several bulbs may grow in a clump and are usually just beneath the surface of the soil. In the spring, each bulb produces a rosette of about ten leaves each up to a meter long. They are dark green in color and leathery in texture. They die away by fall, when the bulb produces a tall, narrow raceme of flowers. This inflorescence can reach   in height. The tepals are white, with the exception of those on the red-flowered form.

Ecology
This plant often grows in rocky coastal habitat, especially in the Mediterranean Basin, where it is common. It occurs in many other types of habitat, except for the driest deserts. It can grow in open and also in very shady areas. Its habit of producing leaves in the spring and flowers in the fall is an adaptation to the Mediterranean climate of its native range, where the summers are hot and dry.

This species has two different pollination syndromes, entomophily and anemophily; it is pollinated by insects and wind. Insect pollinators include the western honey bee (Apis mellifera), the Oriental hornet (Vespa orientalis), and the paper wasp species Polistes gallicus.

Uses 
The plant has been used as a poison and as a medicinal remedy. The main active compounds are cardiac glycosides, including unique bufadienolides such as glucoscillaren A, proscillaridine A, scillaren A, scilliglaucoside and scilliphaeoside. The plant can have a cardiac glycoside content of up to 3%. Scilliroside, the most important of the toxic compounds, is present in all parts of the plant. The broad leaves of this plant, when they completely dry-out, lose their toxicity and are consumed by cattle and sheep. In Palestine, Arab peasants are known to use the plant to mark the butts and bounds of farm land, on account of the plant's distinct features.

Medicine
This species has been used as a medicinal plant since ancient times. It is noted in the Ebers Papyrus of the 16th century BC, one of the oldest medical texts of ancient Egypt. Pythagoras wrote about it in the 6th century BC. Hippocrates used it to treat jaundice, convulsions, and asthma. Theophrastus was also familiar with it. Its primary medicinal use was as a treatment for edema, then called dropsy, because of the diuretic properties of the cardiac glycosides. A solution of sea squill and vinegar was a common remedy for centuries. The plant is also used as a laxative and an expectorant.

Poison
The plant has also been used as a poison. It is very bitter, so most animals avoid it. Rats, however, eat it readily, and then succumb to the toxic scilliroside. This has made the plant a popular rodenticide for nearly as long as it has been in use as a medicine. The bulbs are dried and cut into chips, which can then be powdered and mixed with rat bait. The plant was introduced as an experimental agricultural crop in the 20th century primarily to develop high-toxicity varieties for use as rat poison. Interest continued to develop as rats became resistant to coumarin-based poisons.

It has also been tested as an insecticide against pests such as the red flour beetle (Tribolium castaneum).

Spiritual use
Pythagoras and Dioscorides hung the bulbs with sprouted leaves outside the door in spring as protection against evil spirits. The bulbs are still gathered and displayed in the winter as part of Greek Christmas and new years traditions.

Ornamental use
The tall inflorescences are used as cut flowers in floristry.

Gallery

References

External links

 USDA PLANTS Profile
 Wildflowers of Israel

Flora of Lebanon
Flora of North Africa
Medicinal plants
Plants described in 1753
Scilloideae
Taxa named by Carl Linnaeus
Poisonous plants